FFW may refer to:

 Federation of Free Workers
 Field Fisher Waterhouse LLP
 Fitted For Wireless
 Flash flood warning
 Flying Finn (airline)
 Frankfurt West station, in Frankfurt, Germany
 Future Force Warrior
 The Foot Fist Way, a 2006 American film
 Fast forward wind
 Fast Forward Weekly